Prince of Arcadia is a 1933 British musical comedy film directed by Hanns Schwarz and starring Carl Brisson, Margot Grahame, Ida Lupino and Peter Gawthorne. The screenplay concerns a Ruritanian Prince who is due to marry a princess with acting ambitions, but has fallen in love with another woman. It is a remake of the 1932 German film The Prince of Arcadia.

It was shot at Walton Studios, with sets designed by the art director Andrew Mazzei.

Cast
 Carl Brisson as Prince Peter 
 Margot Grahame as Mirana 
 Ida Lupino as The Princess 
 Annie Esmond as The Queen 
 Peter Gawthorne as Equerry 
 C. Denier Warren as Detective

See also
The Prince of Arcadia (1932)

References

External links

1933 films
1933 musical comedy films
British musical comedy films
Films directed by Hanns Schwarz
British remakes of German films
British black-and-white films
Films set in Europe
Films shot at Nettlefold Studios
1930s English-language films
1930s British films